Jacob Bailey (born June 18, 1997) is an American football punter for the Miami Dolphins of the National Football League (NFL). He played college football at Stanford.

College career
While at Stanford, Bailey had the longest punt in the school's history at 84 yards. In four years he punted 185 times and is the all-time team leader in career punt average with 43.8 yards per kick. Bailey was a three-time All-Pac-12 honoree and two-time Pac-12 All-Academic honorable mention.

College statistics

Professional career

New England Patriots

2019 season

Bailey was drafted by the New England Patriots in the fifth round (163rd overall) of the 2019 NFL Draft.

Upon joining the roster, Bailey competed with incumbent punter Ryan Allen, who had been with the Patriots for 6 seasons. Bailey won the competition, and Allen was released on August 19, 2019, after the Patriots' second preseason game. Bailey serves as the Patriots' holder on field goals, as Allen did. After Patriots kicker Stephen Gostkowski was placed on injured reserve, Bailey took over kickoff duties as well.

On September 25, 2019, he was named AFC Special Teams Player of the Week for his efforts against the New York Jets in Week 3. He again won the American Football Conference Special Teams Player of the Week in Week 11 versus the Philadelphia Eagles, when he had five punts of 50+ yards and six landing inside the 20.

2020 season
He averaged 48.7 gross yards per punt, had a long of 71, and landed 31 punts inside the 20 yard line.

Bailey was one of three Patriots players, along with special teamer Matthew Slater and cornerback Stephon Gilmore, named to the 2021 Pro Bowl.

In January 2021, Bailey was named to the 2020 AP All-Pro first team at punter, making him the first Patriots punter so honored. He received 26 of 50 votes. Bailey was one of three Patriots special teamers named to the team; Gunner Olszewski was named first-team punt returner, and Matthew Slater was named second-team special teamer.

2022 season
On August 1, 2022, Bailey signed a four-year, $13.5 million contract extension through the 2025 season. He was placed on injured reserve on November 19, 2022.

2023 season
On March 10, 2023, Bailey was released by the New England Patriots. Then on March 17, 2023, he signed with the Miami Dolphins with contract details undisclosed.

Miami Dolphins
On March 17, 2023, Bailey signed with the Miami Dolphins.

NFL career statistics

Regular season

Postseason

Personal life
His parents are Brad and Susan Bailey and he has one sister named Aly. While at Stanford, he got his pilot's license.

References

External links
New England Patriots profile
Stanford profile

Living people
People from Solana Beach, California
Players of American football from California
Sportspeople from San Diego County, California
American football punters
Stanford Cardinal football players
Miami Dolphins players
New England Patriots players
1997 births
American Conference Pro Bowl players